Cardle is a surname. Notable people with the surname include:

Joe Cardle (born 1987), English footballer
Matt Cardle (born 1983), English singer and songwriter
Scott Cardle (born 1989), British boxer

See also
Cardale (surname)
Carole